Ri Yong-gum (리용금,born 20 April 1999) is a North Korean skier. In 2017, she competed at an event in Russia, where she came 83rd and last. Ri did not meet the Olympic qualifying standard, but was invited to compete in the Women's 10 kilometre freestyle event at the 2018 Winter Olympics in PyeongChang, South Korea. Ri finished 89th out of 90 competitors, 11 minutes and 39.9 seconds behind the winner, Ragnhild Haga. During the event, Ri fell over and also took a wrong turning.

References

External links
FIS Profile

1999 births
Living people
Cross-country skiers at the 2018 Winter Olympics
North Korean female cross-country skiers
Olympic cross-country skiers of North Korea